The Dallas Desperados were a professional arena football team based in Dallas, Texas. The Desperados played in the Eastern Division of the Arena Football League from 2002 to 2008.

The team was owned by Jerry Jones, who also owns the Dallas Cowboys. Jones' son-in-law Shy Anderson was the COO of the team, and oversaw the day-to-day operations of the franchise.

The team folded effective August 4, 2009, upon the dissolving of the original AFL. Unlike most AFL teams, Jones maintains the intellectual property rights to the Desperados.

History

During a halftime interview at a Cowboys preseason game on August 12, 2000, Jerry Jones revealed to Babe Laufenberg that the AFL had granted him an expansion franchise to begin play in 2001. On November 14, 2001, Dallas officially joined the AFL. The team was originally going to be named the "Dallas Texans", following in the footsteps of Dallas’ former AFL franchise which existed from 1990–1993. However, that same year he sold the rights to the name "Texans" for a reported $10 million to the new Houston franchise. After a contest in which fans voted via the team’s official website, the new Dallas team was eventually named the Desperados. Jones appointed Cowboys special teams coach Joe Avezzano as head coach, and on November 21, 2001 in the AFL expansion draft, they acquired their first player, lineman Aaron Hamilton.

Avezzano, along with starting quarterback Andy Kelly, led the team to a respectable 7–7 record and a playoff appearance in the team's first season of play, and a 10–6 record and a second consecutive playoff berth in 2003 under new quarterback Jim Kubiak. However, Avezzano was fired from the Cowboys staff that season, and subsequently resigned as Desperados head coach when he accepted a job with the Oakland Raiders.

Before the 2004 season, Jones hired Will McClay to replace Avezzano, and McClay struggled to a 6–10 record his rookie season as coach. The team improved to 8–7–1 the following season and barely missed making the playoffs, and under the helm of quarterback/offensive coordinator Clint Dolezel, posted a 13–3 record in 2006 and made their first appearance in an AFL conference championship game, losing to the Orlando Predators. The following season saw the Desperados post an AFL record fifteen wins and the team appeared destined to make their first ArenaBowl appearance, but they were shocked by the Columbus Destroyers, who had entered the playoffs with a 7–9 record, in the first round. The upset is ranked by many among the greatest of all time. The following season saw no relief to the postseason failure as the Desperados at 12–4 lost to the 8–8 New York Dragons in Dallas.  After the New Orleans VooDoo folded, the league placed the Desperados in the South Division after the team had spent five seasons as an Eastern Division powerhouse.

With the exception of one playoff game and the entirety of the 2003 season, the Desperados played all of their home games at American Airlines Center.  The team’s official mascot was Kid Coyote.

Memorable Desperados moments
On June 9, 2007, the Desperados faced the 4–9 New Orleans VooDoo. The 13–1 Desperados found themselves losing late in the game. But Dallas Quarterback Clint Dolezel threw a touchdown with 30 seconds left on the clock to give the Desperados the lead. On the ensuing kickoff, the VooDoo fielded the ball off the net and found themselves looking at a long way to the endzone from their own one-yard line. They managed to put together a lengthy drive and were able to score with 1.7 seconds left to make the score 80–79. Rather than tie the game with an extra point, they elected to go for the win with a two-point conversion. VooDoo Quarterback Steve Bellisari dropped back and was sacked by 2007 AFL lineman of the year Colston Weatherington on the ten. The game was over along with the VooDoo playoff hopes. In the end, Dallas won 80–79.

The game was voted 2007 "Game of the Year" leaguewide in July 2007.

Season-by-season

Coaches

Notable players

Final roster

Arena Football Hall of Famers

Individual awards

All-Arena players
The following Desperados players were named to All-Arena Teams:
 QB Clint Dolezel (2)
 FB Josh White (1)
 FB/LB Duke Pettijohn (1)
 WR/DB Will Pettis (3)
 OL/DL Tom Briggs (1), Colston Weatherington (1)
 OL Devin Wyman (1), Terrance Dotsy (1)
 DL Colston Weatherington (2)
 LB Duke Pettijohn (2)
 DB Jermaine Jones (1)
 K Remy Hamilton (1)

All-Ironman players
The following Desperados players were named to All-Ironman Teams:
 FB/LB Duke Pettijohn (3)
 WR/DB Will Pettis (5)
 OL/DL Tom Briggs (1)

All-Rookie players
The following Desperados players were named to All-Rookie Teams:
 QB Clint Stoerner
 FB/LB Ja'Mar Toombs
 WR/DB Will Pettis
 WR/LB Andy McCullough
 OL/DL Shante Carver, Colston Weatherington
 DB Bobby Keyes
 DS Kareem Larrimore, Jermaine Jones

See also
Fort Worth Cavalry
Dallas Vigilantes

References

External links
 Official website
 Dallas Desperados at ArenaFan

 
2002 establishments in Texas
2009 disestablishments in Texas
Sports clubs established in 2002
Sports clubs disestablished in 2009